Dalen Mmako (born 12 June 1996) is a South African cricketer. He made his first-class debut for Northerns in the 2017–18 Sunfoil 3-Day Cup on 18 January 2018. He made his List A debut for Northerns in the 2017–18 CSA Provincial One-Day Challenge on 21 January 2018.

References

External links
 

1996 births
Living people
South African cricketers
Northerns cricketers
Place of birth missing (living people)